The Kroll process is a pyrometallurgical industrial  process used to produce metallic titanium from titanium tetrachloride.  The Kroll process replaced the Hunter process for almost all commercial production.

Process
In the Kroll process, the TiCl4 is reduced by liquid magnesium to give titanium metal:
TiCl4 + 2Mg ->[825^oC]Ti + 2MgCl2
The reduction is conducted at 800–850 °C in a stainless steel retort. Complications result from partial reduction of the TiCl4, giving to the lower chlorides TiCl2 and TiCl3.  The MgCl2 can be further refined back to magnesium.    The resulting porous metallic titanium sponge is purified by leaching or vacuum distillation. The sponge is crushed, and pressed before it is melted in a consumable carbon electrode vacuum arc furnace.  The melted ingot is allowed to solidify under vacuum.  It is often remelted to remove inclusions and ensure uniformity.  These melting steps add to the cost of the product.  Titanium is about six times as expensive as stainless steel.

In the earlier Hunter process, which ceased to be commercial in the 1990s, the TiCl4 from the chloride process is reduced to the metal by sodium.

History and subsequent developments
The Kroll process was invented in 1940 by William J. Kroll in Luxembourg.  After moving to the United States, Kroll further developed the method for the production of zirconium. 
Many methods had been applied to the production of titanium metal, beginning with a report in 1887 by Nilsen and Pettersen using sodium, which was optimized  into the commercial Hunter process. In the 1920s van Arkel had described the thermal decomposition of titanium tetraiodide to give highly pure titanium. Titanium tetrachloride was found to reduce with hydrogen at high temperatures to give hydrides that can be thermally processed to the pure metal. With this background, Kroll developed both new reductants and new apparatus for the reduction of titanium tetrachloride. Its high reactivity toward trace amounts of water and other metal oxides presented challenges. Significant success came with the use of calcium as a reductant, but the resulting mixture still contained significant oxide impurities. Major success using magnesium at 1000 °C using a molybdenum clad reactor, as reported to the Electrochemical Society in Ottawa. Kroll's titanium was highly ductile reflecting its high purity. The Kroll process displaced the Hunter process and continues to be the dominant technology for the production of titanium metal, as well as driving the majority of the world's production of magnesium metal.

See also
 Chloride process

References

Further reading
 P.Kar, Mathematical modeling of phase change electrodes with application to the FFC process, PhD thesis; UC, Berkeley, 2007.

External links
 Titanium: Kroll Method: YouTube video uploaded by Innovations in Manufacturing at Oak Ridge National Laboratory

Industrial processes
Chemical processes
Zirconium
Titanium